A statue of the 19th-century biologist and geologist Louis Agassiz was installed on the exterior of Jordan Hall, in the Main Quad of Stanford University, in the U.S. state of California.

History

During the 1906 San Francisco earthquake, the statue, made of marble, fell from the second floor of the zoology building. The New York Times Rebecca Stott writes, "The great scientist, with his head buried in concrete, his upturned body sticking up into air, became an iconic image of the earthquake." The statue was not damaged.

In 2020, the Stanford Department of Psychology requested to remove the statue from the front façade of its building due to his support of polygenism. The statue was removed in October 2020.

See also
 List of monuments and memorials removed during the George Floyd protests

References

External links

 

1906 San Francisco earthquake
Marble sculptures in the United States
Monuments and memorials removed during the George Floyd protests
Outdoor sculptures in California
Sculptures of men in California
Stanford University buildings and structures
Statues in California
Statues removed in 2020